Sevengill shark may refer to:
Broadnose sevengill shark
Sharpnose sevengill shark